The 2023 World Rally-Raid Championship is the second season of the annual competition for rally raid events sanctioned by both the FIA and FIM. The Amaury Sport Organization is in the second of a five-year contract to promote the championship.

Calendar 
The calendar for the 2023 season will feature five rally-raid events. The famous Dakar Rally will again be the opening event while both the Abu Dhabi Desert Challenge and Rallye du Maroc return as longstanding events. New for 2023 are the Mexico-based Sonora Rally and Argentina's Desafio Ruta 40; replacing rounds originally held in Kazakhstan and Spain.

FIA World Rally-Raid Championship 
Entrants competing in the T1, T2, T3, and T4 classes are eligible for the overall World Championship.

Entry list

Results

FIA Rally-Raid World Championship for Drivers, Co-Drivers, and Manufacturers 
Points system
Competitors have to be registered to score points.
 Points for final positions in rally events are awarded as per the following table:

 Points for final positions in marathon events are awarded as per the following table:

Drivers' & Co-Drivers' championships

Manufacturer's championship 
Points system
A registered manufacturer is allowed to enter a maximum of three crews in each event. Only the top two from each manufacturer will count towards their score. Points are awarded on the same scales as set out for drivers/co-drivers.

FIM World Rally-Raid Championship 
Only RallyGP entrants are eligible to compete for the World Championship.

Entry list

Results

FIM Rally-Raid World Championship for Riders and Manufacturers 
Points system
 A rider has to be registered to score points
 Points for final positions in rally events are awarded as per the following table:

 A coefficient of 1.5 will be applied to marathon events. The result will be rounded up to the nearest integer.

Rider's championship

Manufacturer's championship 
Points system
 Points are awarded to the top-two finishing entries for each manufacturer.

FIA Rally-Raid Championship

T3

Entry list

Results

FIA Rally-Raid Championship for T3 Drivers and Co-Drivers 
Points system
Competitors have to be registered to score points.
 Points for final positions in rally events are awarded as per the following table:

 Points for final positions in marathon events are awarded as per the following table:

T3 Drivers' & Co-Drivers' championships

T4

Entry list

Results

FIA Rally-Raid Championship for T4 Drivers and Co-Drivers 
Points system
Competitors have to be registered to score points.
 Points for final positions in rally events are awarded as per the following table:

 Points for final positions in marathon events are awarded as per the following table:

T4 Drivers' & Co-Drivers' championships

T5 
Entries competing in the T5 category will only compete in the legs at Dakar, Abu Dhabi, and Morocco.

Entry list

Results

FIA Rally-Raid Championship for T5 Drivers and Co-Drivers 
Points system
Competitors have to be registered to score points.
 Points for final positions in rally events are awarded as per the following table:

 Points for final positions in marathon events are awarded as per the following table:

T5 Drivers' & Co-Drivers' championships

FIM Rally-Raid World Cup

Rally2

Entry list

Results

FIM Rally-Raid World Cup for Rally2 Riders 
Points system
 A rider has to be registered to score points
 Points for final positions in rally events are awarded as per the following table:

 A coefficient of 1.5 will be applied to marathon events. The result will be rounded up to the nearest integer.

Rider's championship

Rally3

Entry list

Results

FIM Rally-Raid World Cup for Rally3 Riders 
Points system
 A rider has to be registered to score points
 Points for final positions in rally events are awarded as per the following table:

 A coefficient of 1.5 will be applied to marathon events. The result will be rounded up to the nearest integer.

Rider's championship

Quad

Entry list

Results

FIM Rally-Raid World Cup for Quad Riders 
Points system
 A rider has to be registered to score points
 Points for final positions in rally events are awarded as per the following table:

 A coefficient of 1.5 will be applied to marathon events. The result will be rounded up to the nearest integer.

Rider's championship

FIM Rally-Raid Trophies

FIM Junior trophy

FIM Women's trophy

FIM Veteran's trophy

References

External links 
 
  - FIA Rally-Raid
  - FIM Rally-Raid

World Rally-Raid Championship
World Rally-Raid Championship
World Rally-Raid Championship